Euler Granda (June 7, 1935 – February 22, 2018) was an Ecuadorian poet, writer, and psychiatrist.

Biography
Granda was born in Riobamba, Ecuador, on June 7, 1935, to Aurora Espinoza and Ángel Polibio Granda. He was married to the poet Violeta Luna, with whom he had four children. After he and Luna divorced, he married Ximena Mendoza Párraga, also a poet. They had no children.

Career
Granda studied psychiatry at the Central University of Ecuador and the University of Guayaquil. Parallel to his studies in medicine, he also became interested in literature, particularly in poetry. Granda's poems often explored the human mental condition. In a (translated) interview with El Universo, Granda pointed out that "the poetry that I do in a certain way is surreal, that is, using elements and internal experiences of the human being. It's a huge advantage to have been a psychiatrist."

Granda published 17 books during his lifetime.

Death
Granda died on February 22, 2018, at the age of 82.

Awards
 The Eugenio Espejo Prize in Literature (2009)
 The "Jorge Luis Borges" Latin American Poetry Prize (1987)
 First Place in El Universo's "Ismael Pérez Pazmiño" Poetry Prize (1961)

Works
 El rostro de los días (1961) winner of the "Ismael Pérez Pazmiño" Poetry Prize
 Voz desbordada (1963)
 Etcétera, etcétera (1965)
 El lado flaco (1968)
 El cuerpo y los sucesos (1971)
 La inutilmanía y otros nudos, Poesía y Un perro tocando la lira

References 

1935 births
2018 deaths
20th-century Ecuadorian poets
21st-century Ecuadorian poets
People from Riobamba
Ecuadorian male poets
20th-century male writers